Na'im Busofash (lit. "Moving on weekend" or "Pleasant on weekend") is an Israeli weekend public transportation array that exists in 7 authorities in Gush Dan – Givatayim, Kiryat Ono, Ramat HaSharon, Tel Aviv-Yafo, Shoham, Modi'in-Maccabim-Re'ut and Hod HaSharon.

History

The Status Quo in Israel about public transportation on Shabbat 

As a part of the Status Quo in Israel about the Shabbat, in most areas of Israel, public transportation is inactive on Shabbat (Except for lines in remote settlements at the edges of the country, the city of Haifa and other mixed cities such as Nazareth and Nof HaGalil, taxis and Share taxis).

During the 2010s, a number of private projects aimed at operating transportation services on weekends (and especially on Shabbats) began by establishing cooperative associations. Such projects include "Shabus" (שבוס; a portmanteau of the words Shabbat and bus), which operates in Jerusalem; "Noa Tanua" (נוע תנוע; lit. Move), which operates in Gush Dan; Be'er Sheva and Haifa, "Sababus" (סבבוס; a portmanteau of the Hebrew word "Sababa" and the word "bus"), which operates between Ramat Gan and Tel Aviv; and "Kave HaHof" (קווי החוף; lit. "The coastlines"), which operates in Herzliya and Tel Aviv.

"Na'im Busofash" project 
In October 2019, it became known that a number of cities checked the possibility of operating scheduled bus lines on Shabbats. And in October 2019, The Municipality of Tel Aviv launched a tender for operating constant lines during the Sabbath, and started inquiries with nearby local authorities with a view to establishing a future network of lines that will operate across Gush Dan.

The service began operating on Friday, November 22, 2019.

Operating public transportation in these areas is not against the law, because the law does not prohibit such public transportation, because it is operated privately by cities in Israel (and not by the transportation companies operated by the Ministry of Transportation), and because there is no charge for the ride (and if the Knesset would legislate a law regulating public transportation on Shabbat, the rides will cost money, because those rides will be officially considered public transportation in the law).

In January 2020, it became known that the local authorities Hod HaSharon, Shoham and Yehud-Monosson will join the project by the end of the month.

In the ninth week of the project activity (January 17–18, 2020), the seventh line, line 711, was added to the six lines that had operated until then, connecting Tel Aviv-Yafo to Yehud-Monosson and Shoham.

About the project 

Nowadays, 8 local authorities in Israel partner with the weekend transportation array: Givatayim, Kiryat Ono, Ramat HaSharon, Tel Aviv-Yafo, Shoham, Modi'in-Maccabim-Re'ut, Hod HaSharon and Kfar Saba

The project is operated by the company "Taxi Service Lines 4,5 Ltd.", which won the bid for its operation.

The project currently operated every weekend (Friday-Saturday): On Friday, from 5:00 pm to 2:00 am; And on Saturday, from 9:00 am to 5:00 pm, with a frequency of 20 minutes regularly throughout the hours of operation.

The transportation network is based on buses and 19-seat minibuses transportation array. The array includes 11 lines across the authorities (lines 705–714 and 717), and stops at more than 600 stops. The lines let you ride to the center of the cities and between the various neighborhoods, and to the main entertainment and leisure places.

The "Na'im Busofash" line system is designed so it will pass mainly on the main roads and minimize entrance into inner streets in the neighborhoods, taking into account areas where Sabbath observers live. In addition, to prevent damage to share taxis, "Na'im Busofash" lines do not pass through the ride areas where share taxis operate on weekends.

The rides on "Na'im Busofash" lines are free, as charging for public transportation on weekends is prohibited by law (except where public transportation on Saturday is officially operated by the Ministry of Transportation).

The stations where the minibuses and buses pass are signed by stickers with the numbers of the lines that stop at them, and the minibuses and buses of the service are branded with signage, the number of lines and the main destinations where they stop at.

Every third bus that arrives (every hour and a half) is accessible for disabled passengers.

The electronic information screens at stops belong to and are operated by the Ministry of Transportation, and it's unable to receive information about "Na'im Busofash" lines, which operated by the municipalities. It is also not possible to get information about the availability and their routes in the official application of the Ministry of Transportation for ride times "Kol-Kav" (כל-קו; lit. "Every line"). Alternatively, 4 alternative transportation apps are available for this: "Otobus Karov" (אוטובוס קרוב; lit. "Bus Nearby"), "Efo Bus" (איפה בוס; lit. "Where's a Bus"), "My-Way", and "Moovit".

During the service hours on the weekends, there is a call center that can be contacted. There is a dedicated site for the project, available in Hebrew, English and Arabic, where information about the service can be found.

Demand 
In the first week of service activity (November 22–23, 2019), the demand for the project was higher than expected, and already in the first hour of operation, demand for rides was higher than expected, so the Tel Aviv municipality increased the service and added another minibus to each of the six lines on the network – three instead of two.

Because the ride is free, there is no mechanism that counts their exact number. But the first week, according to estimates, the service was used by about 10,000 people. As the frequency increases, and the minibuses are replaced by buses, it is planned to serve a much larger public.

To cope with the high demand was in the first week, in the second week of activity (November 29–30, 2019), the project was increased by additional minibuses and 52-seats buses. It was reported that the lines were still full of people, but no special malfunctions happened as in the first week.

Criticism

Negative criticism 

The weekend public transportation project "Na'im Busofash" has received many harsh criticisms from the religious and ultra-Orthodox Jews in Israel.
On the fourth weekend of the project (December 13–14, 2019), hundreds of ultra-Orthodox people protested against the operation of the public transportation system. At the same protest, police arrested 16 ultra-Orthodox people for blocking roads, disorderly conduct and throwing stones at the cops.

In addition, some of the criticisms allege that the public transportation project on Shabbats is against the law.

While the meeting to approve joining the project in the city of Yehud-Monosson, hundreds of city residents came to the city hall in protest, calling "not to approve the anti-Jewish move".

Negative reviews also came from taxi drivers, but not about the service itself, but about the fact that it is free, thus it hurts their main livelihood (on the weekends). Drivers say they feel a dramatic drop in the number of the rides following the project.

Positive criticism 
Alongside the many negative reviews, there have been many positive reviews of the public transportation project.
Many positive reviews are heard from the passengers in the project, who in his first ride noted that "this is a historic day".
Knesset member Avigdor Lieberman also praised the project that it "blocks the religious coercion that is trying to be forced in cities where there is a secular majority."

See also 
Status quo (Israel)

References

External links 
 
 
 

Public transport in Israel